KFTK-FM (97.1 MHz) is a commercial talk radio station licensed to Florissant, Missouri. Owned by Audacy, Inc., KFTK-FM services the Greater St. Louis metropolitan area, and is the local affiliate for several nationally syndicted programs: The Brian Kilmeade Show; The Dana Loesch Show; Coast to Coast AM with George Noory and This Morning, America's First News with Gordon Deal.  Most hours begin with an update from Fox News Radio.

The KFTK-FM studios are on Olive Street in St. Louis, while the station transmitter is in nearby O'Fallon. Besides a standard analog transmission, KFTK-FM broadcasts using HD Radio technology, carrying CBS Sports Radio on its HD2 digital subchannel. KFTK is available online via Audacy.

History

Early years 
The station originally signed on the air in 1977, as KSCF. The call letters stood for St. Charles and Florissant. The station featured a middle of the road/easy listening format. One of the original owners was Harlan "Grant" Horton, a longtime St. Louis broadcaster at KSD, WRTH, KMOX, KXOK and WEW.  The sign on of 97.1 caused KADI-FM to move from its original frequency of 96.5 to 96.3 to accommodate the new radio station.

Adult contemporary (1980-1989) 
In 1980, after the KCFM call letters were dropped by 93.7, they were picked up by 97.1, and the station aired an adult contemporary format until November 1985, when the call letters would change once again to KLTH "K-Lite 97", with a soft adult contemporary format. KLTH gradually segued into a format called "new adult contemporary", an early predecessor to the smooth jazz format, and re-branded as "Breeze 97".

Top 40 (1989–1992) 
On August 2, 1989, the station was sold once again, and the new owners flipped the station to Top 40 as "Hot 97" with the call letters KHTK. The Top 40 format ended when then-rival WKBQ was briefly under lease by the station's owner Saul Frischling of Pittsburgh, and both top 40 stations were merged at 106.5, taking personalities from both stations.

Urban AC (1992–1998) 
On November 11, 1992, KHTK changed call letters to KXOK-FM, and flipped to urban AC as "Mix 97.1", after the urban oldies format from the former KXOK (630 AM) was moved to FM. "Mix" would try to compete with the Urban AC leader in St. Louis, KMJM-FM ("Majic 108"). The two stations simulcasted briefly before the AM was taken off the air completely, pending a sale to a religious broadcaster. The station carried the syndicated Tom Joyner Morning Show, which would be heard in the market for many years across multiple stations.

Classic rock (1998–2000) 
In 1998, Frischling sold KXOK to the Sinclair Broadcast Group, which owned ABC affiliate KDNL-TV, along with radio stations KPNT, WVRV, WIL-FM, and KIHT. In September of that year, the urban format was dropped, and the station began simulcasting KPNT. On September 25, KXOK began stunting with a 48-hour loop of "Welcome to the Jungle" by Guns N' Roses and a clip from Field of Dreams, "If you build it, they will come." Two days later, KXOK switched formats to classic rock as "97 FM The Rock" while retaining the KXOK-FM call letters. To celebrate Mark McGwire hitting 70 home runs, the station launched by playing 7,000 songs in a row without commercials or DJ interruption. The first song on "The Rock" was "There's Only One Way to Rock" by Sammy Hagar. 

Despite signal issues, the station enjoyed the most success seen on the frequency to that date as a competitor to Emmis Communications' KSHE, at times beating them in the overall ratings. KSHE aired the syndicated Bob and Tom morning show, while KXOK countered with local hosts (and KSHE alumni) Randy Raley and Mike Doran. Other KXOK DJs included Tom O'Keefe (middays), Jason Mack (afternoons), and Michelle Matthews (evenings). Overnights were automated. The station began with a standard 1960s-70s classic rock format, but evolved to playing heavy does of 1980s hair bands. The station would also play occasional 1990s music from artists like Pearl Jam, The Black Crowes, and Cracker.

Talk (2000–present) 
In the fall of 2000, Emmis Communications added to its St. Louis radio portfolio by purchasing properties from Sinclair Broadcasting, which wanted to focus on its television properties. The sale to Emmis led KXOK and KSHE to become sister stations. Upon purchasing KXOK, and to avoid overlap with KSHE, KXOK changed formats to talk radio on October 16, 2000; the call letters changed to KFTK two days later. Initially, the station focused on a female audience, which included such syndicated personalities as Bob and Sheri, Dr. Joy Browne, Clark Howard, Dr. Laura, Phil Hendrie, Rhona at Night, Loveline, and John and Jeff, as well as local host Dave Glover. The station used the name "97.1 FM Talk". Failing to reach much of an audience, the station shifted toward more political talk in 2002, adding such syndicated hosts as Don Imus, Bill O'Reilly, and Sean Hannity. The station briefly changed its name to "97-1 the Link...Real Life Radio", but soon returned to the "FM Talk" moniker.

The call sign was modified from KFTK to KFTK-FM on September 8, 2016. On September 15, 2016, KFTK-FM began simulcasting on WQQX (1490 AM), renamed KFTK, and FM translator station K254CR to improve the station's coverage in downtown St. Louis and the Illinois side of the market.

Emmis exited the St. Louis market in 2018, with KFTK-FM and KNOU being sold to Entercom (now Audacy). The simulcast over KFTK ended on March 20, 2020 when that station's license was cancelled by the commission, after it was revealed that the AM station's ownership was a shell corporation that allowed a convicted felon to own it. K254CR was not affected, and was subsequently reassigned to simulcast KFTK-FM until March 22, 2021, when K254CR was reassigned to broadcast AM sister station KMOX.

References 

KXOK Radio Collection Finding Aid at the St. Louis Public Library
KXOK First Issue Letters Collection Finding Aid at the St. Louis Public Library
KXOK New Sound Manuscript Finding Aid at the St. Louis Public Library

External links
 
 

FTK-FM
News and talk radio stations in the United States
Audacy, Inc. radio stations
Radio stations established in 1977
1977 establishments in Missouri